The Ministry of Emergency Situations of Belarus is a government agency overseeing emergency services in Belarus. It is responsible for protecting the Belarusian people during natural disasters. It is located on Revaliucyjnaja Street in Minsk. The Ministry for Emergency Situations was established in accordance a decree of President Alexander Lukashenko on September 23, 1994.

Duties
The ministry performs the following duties:

 Control and management in the sphere of prevention and liquidation of emergency situations of natural and man-made disasters and civil defense
 Provide fire, industrial, nuclear and radiation safety
 Dealing with the consequences of the Chernobyl disaster
 The creation and preservation of state and mobilization material reserves
 Regulation in the field of safety of navigation of small vessels on inland waterways of Belarus

Ministers 

 Ivan Kenik (1994—1999)
 Valery Astapov (1999—2004)
 Enver Bariev (2004—2010)

 Uladzimir Vashchanka (2010—2021)
 Vadim Sinyavsky (2021—present)

Structure

Apparatus 

 Minister 
 First Deputy Minister 
 Deputy Ministers
 Deputy Minister
 Deputy Minister
 Deputy Minister 
 Assistant Minister - Spokesman
 General Directorate of the State System for Prevention and Elimination of Emergencies and Civil Protection
 Management of Emergency Services and Emergency Response
 Office Management and Enforcement
 Personnel Management
 Logistics Management
 Office of International Cooperation
 Management of Surveillance and Prevention
 Legal Support Management
 Management of Financial and Economic Work
 Department of Science and Innovation Development
 Operational Management Department
 Department of Organization of Public Education and Training
 Department of Regime-Secret Work
 Communication and Alerts Department
 Construction Department
 Sector of Ideological Work
 Mobilization Sector
 Security Sector

Territorial Directorates 

Brest Oblast Directorate
Vitebsk Oblast Directorate
Gomel Oblast Directorate
Grodno Oblast Directorate
Minsk Oblast Directorate
Mogilev City Directorate
Minsk City Directorate

Educational and scientific departments 

 University of Civil Protection of the Ministry of Emergency Situations

 Research Institute of Fire Safety and Emergencies
 Lyceum at the Gomel Engineering Institute
 State Aviation Emergency Rescue Institution
 Republican Special Detachment
 Republican Center for Emergency Management and Response
 Republican Center for Certification and Examination of Licensed Activities
 Republican Logistics Center
 Republican Control and Revision Inspectorate
 Centralized Accounting

Subordinate government organizations 

 Evacuation Administration
 Scientific Production Republican Unitary Enterprise "Security Emergency"
 Belinvestkamplekt Republican Unitary Enterprise
 Diekos Republican Unitary Enterprise
 Institute of Radiology
 Uniform Production
 Polesie Republican Unit
 Radon Specialized Unit
 Bellesavia Republican Unit
 Children's Rehabilitation and Wellness Center
 Zhdanovichi State Reserve
 Polesie State Radiation Ecological Reserve
 Protection Units

See also 
 Ministry of Emergency Situations (disambiguation)
 Armed Forces of Belarus

References

External links 
  - Official Website
 МЧС Беларуси - Official Youtube

Websites of directorates 
 Brest Oblast Directorate
 Vitebsk Oblast Directorate
 Gomel Oblast Directorate
 Grodno Oblast Directorate
 Minsk Oblast Directorate
 Mogilev City Directorate
 Minsk City Directorate

Government ministries of Belarus
Government of Belarus